Phoenetia Maiya Lureen Browne (born 22 April 1994) is an American-born Saint Kitts and Nevis footballer who plays as a Forward for French club Saint-Étienne and the Saint Kitts and Nevis women's national team.

Club career
During the summer of 2017, Browne played for Sindri in the 1. deild kvenna, netting ten goals in 16 matches.

In August 2020, Browne signed with Úrvalsdeild kvenna club Fimleikafélag Hafnarfjarðar.

International goals
Saint Kitts and Nevis score listed first, score column indicates score after each Browne goal.

References

External links 

1994 births
Living people
Citizens of Saint Kitts and Nevis through descent
Saint Kitts and Nevis women's footballers
Women's association football forwards
Women's association football midfielders
FCU Olimpia Cluj players
Åland United players
Phoenetia Browne
Phoenetia Browne
Saint Kitts and Nevis women's international footballers
Saint Kitts and Nevis expatriate women's footballers
Saint Kitts and Nevis expatriate sportspeople in Iceland
Expatriate women's footballers in Iceland
Saint Kitts and Nevis expatriate sportspeople in France
Expatriate women's footballers in France
Saint Kitts and Nevis expatriate sportspeople in Romania
Expatriate women's footballers in Romania
Saint Kitts and Nevis expatriate sportspeople in Finland
Expatriate women's footballers in Finland
Sportspeople from the Bronx
Soccer players from New York City
American women's soccer players
Columbia Lions women's soccer players
Texas Longhorns women's soccer players
American expatriate women's soccer players
American expatriate sportspeople in Iceland
American expatriate sportspeople in France
American expatriate sportspeople in Romania
American expatriate sportspeople in Finland
African-American women's soccer players
American people of Saint Kitts and Nevis descent
21st-century African-American sportspeople
21st-century African-American women